VA244 may refer to:
 Ariane flight VA244, an Ariane 5 launch that occurred on 25 July 2018
 Virgin Australia flight 244, with IATA flight number VA244
 Virginia State Route 244 (VA-244), a primary state highway in the United States